"House on Fire" is a song by the American rock band Rise Against. The song was released on January 9, 2018 as the second single from their eighth studio album, Wolves. Originally made available as a pre-release buzz track on May 21, 2017, the song was written by lead singer Tim McIlrath about the perils of fatherhood.

Composition 
In an interview with Matt Pinfield on the 2 Hours with Matt Pinfield podcast, lead singer Tim McIlrath stated that "When you hear it you might hear a kind of classic love-and-loss-like love song... but the song actually is about becoming a parent. I like to think I have the world figured out, but once you throw a 13-year-old daughter your way you realize, I have nothing figured out. And this is an incredible challenge that's at the same time worth it."

Loudwire stated that the song was built around a "driving drum and guitar beat powering a majority of the song, allowing for the occasional pull back to let Tim McIlrath's raspy yet commanding vocals take the attention."

Release 
On January 9, 2018, "House on Fire" was officially sent for adds on alternative radio stations.

Music video 
On January 9, 2018, a music video for the song was also released. The video was directed by Daniel Carberry and revolves around a grandfather's love for his granddaughter. The granddaughter is gifted with the ability to control fire, which goes awry as her grandfather must venture through the fire in order to save her; the members of Rise Against make a cameo appearance at a café watching the news and helping the grandfather on his way. The video's press release states that it represents "the innocence of early childhood giving way to the tumultuous coming-of-age years" and "how personal relationships can also have an impact on our world."

Charts

Weekly charts

Year-end charts

References 

2018 songs
American punk rock songs
Virgin Records singles
2018 singles
Rise Against songs
Songs written by Tim McIlrath